Phoenix City Hall is the center of government for the city of Phoenix, Arizona, United States.

Background
Located in Downtown Phoenix, the 20-floor, 368-foot (112-meter) building was designed by architectural firm Langdon Wilson. Construction began in 1992 and was completed in 1994. It replaced the former city hall, now known as Old City Hall. The total cost to build City Hall and its adjacent parking garage, and to renovate Old City Hall, was US$83 million.

Additional city services are administered from the Calvin C. Goode Municipal Building.

Phoenix's original city hall, at 1st Street and Washington (on Block 23) was demolished after the construction of Old City Hall.

See also
List of tallest buildings in Phoenix

References

City halls in Arizona
Skyscraper office buildings in Phoenix, Arizona
Government buildings completed in 1994
1990s architecture in the United States
1994 establishments in Arizona